Strongstown is an unincorporated community in Indiana County, Pennsylvania, United States.

References

Unincorporated communities in Indiana County, Pennsylvania
Unincorporated communities in Pennsylvania